Heli is a Chinese construction equipment maker, primarily known for producing forklift trucks. With about US$1 billion in turnover for forklifts, Heli is the largest maker in China and the 7th-largest in the world based on a ranking by 2018 sales revenue compiled by Modern Materials Handling.

References

External link 
 https://www.mmh.com/article/top_20_lift_truck_suppliers_in_2019

Construction equipment manufacturers of China
Manufacturing companies based in Hefei
Manufacturing companies established in 1958
Forklift truck manufacturers
1958 establishments in China
Chinese brands